Martin Stocklasa (born 29 May 1979) is a Liechtenstein football manager and former player who played as a defender. He is the current manager of Liechtenstein club FC Vaduz, who play in the Swiss Challenge League, the second tier of Swiss football.

He played for FC Zürich, FC Vaduz, Dynamo Dresden and SV Ried. Stocklasa, and his brother, Michael (now retired), both represented Liechtenstein at the international level and at the time of his retirement, Martin had 113 caps, which tied him with Mario Frick atop his country's appearances list.

Club career
Born in Grabs, Switzerland, Stocklasa started his senior career at FC Vaduz in 1997 and moved to Swiss side FC Zürich in the summer of 1999. He went on to spend the entire 2000–01 season on loan to SC Kriens, another Swiss club, and returned to FC Zürich for one season before eventually returning to his first club, FC Vaduz, in the summer of 2002 and spending four seasons there before moving to Dynamo Dresden. Stocklasa had been linked with a move to English club Leeds United, prior to his joining SV Ried. He joined FC St. Gallen, of the Swiss Challenge League, after leaving SV Ried in 2011.

In June 2014, Stocklasa announced his retirement from the game.

International career
He was capped 113 times by his country, scoring five goals, and was the team captain. He made his international debut for Liechtenstein in their 5–0 defeat to the Republic of Ireland in a 1998 FIFA World Cup qualifier on 31 August 1996. Stocklasa was the first and currently the only Liechtenstein player to have scored a hat trick in an international game. The achievement came on 17 April 2002, against Luxembourg, in an international friendly.

International goals

Managerial career 
Stocklasa was the Manager of the Liechtenstein U-21 team from 6 February 2019 until December 2020. He was the manager for the U-21's first ever win, a 1-0 victory over Azerbaijan on 6 June 2019.

He was then appointed as Liechtenstein's senior team manager, following the departure of Helgi Kolviðsson.

On 1 March 2023, it was announced that he cancelled his contract with the Liechtenstein Football Association to join FC Vaduz. At the time of his appointment, Vaduz were in ninth place (out of ten) in the Swiss Challenge League.

Honours
FC Vaduz
 Liechtenstein Cup: 1997–98, 1998–99, 2002–03, 2003–04, 2004–05, 2005–06

FC Zürich
 Swiss Cup: 1999–2000

SV Ried
 Austrian Cup: 2010–11

Individual
Liechtensteiner Footballer of the Year: 1997–98, 1999–2000, 2009, 2010, 2011

Managerial Statistics

See also
 List of men's footballers with 100 or more international caps

References

External links
 

1979 births
Living people
Liechtenstein footballers
Association football defenders
Liechtenstein international footballers
Swiss men's footballers
Swiss people of Liechtenstein descent
People with acquired Liechtenstein citizenship
FC Vaduz players
FC Zürich players
SC Kriens players
Dynamo Dresden players
SV Ried players
FC St. Gallen players
Liechtenstein expatriate footballers
Expatriate footballers in Austria
FIFA Century Club